P. Jurgenson (in Russian: П. Юргенсон) was, in the early twentieth century, the largest publisher of classical sheet music in Russia.

History 
Founded in 1861, the firm — in its original form, or as it was amalgamated in 1918 with other Russian music publishing firms into the state-owned music publishing monopoly—endured the latter of three of the four below listed eras (the first three were defined by Lenin as corresponding to three chief classes of Russian society): 

 The Aristocratic Period (roughly from 1825 to 1861) 
 The Middle Class, or Bourgeois-Democratic Period (extending approximately from 1861 to 1895)—P. Jurgenson was founded
 The Proletarian Period (1895 to 1991)
 Post Soviet Russia (1991 to present)

The original P. Jurgenson publishing house

Pyotr Ivanovich Jurgenson (Estonian: Peeter Jürgenson; 17 July 1836, Reval, Estonia – 2 January 1904, Moscow, Russia), founded P. Jurgenson in 1861 on the advice of Nikolai Rubinstein – pianist, conductor, founder of the Moscow Conservatoire, and brother of Anton Rubinstein.  Upon Pyotr Jurgenson's death in 1904, his sons, Boris Petrovich Jurgenson (1868–1935) and Grigory Petrovich Jurgenson (1872–1936), inherited the firm and Boris became its new head (Pyotr Ilyich Tchaikovsky was Boris's godfather).  The firm was a privately owned Russian company from 1861 to 1918.

In 1868, Jurgenson published Tchaikovsky's first composition, and henceforth, nearly all of his other works.  In Tchaikovsky's early career, Jurgenson gave him supportive commissions, including some for piano transcriptions, orchestrations, and translations of works by others.  Jurgenson's zeal to publish Tchaikovsky's works, even when it involved taking on considerable financial risks, earned his loyalty. A few of Tchaikovsky's compositions from the 1870s were published by other firms, including V. Bessel and Co. and Nikolai Bernard.  But, by 1880, Jurgenson secured exclusive rights to publish Tchaikovsky's works, worldwide.  The collaboration between Jurgenson and Tchaikovsky left a prolific trail correspondence that serves as a critical source for music scholars researching the composer's creative life.

Russian composer Sergei Rachmaninoff wrote to music ethnographer Aleksandr Zatayevich about publishing folk Polish mazurkas in Jurgenson's house.

1917 Russian Revolution
In 1918, the company was nationalized by the communist regime, as were all other music publishing companies, into a division of the State Publishing House.  That same year, Boris Petrovich became the head of the musical division of the State Publishing House.  The music division, in 1930, was renamed Gosudarstvennoye Muzykal'noe Izdatelstvo (Государственное музыкальное издательство)—translated as State Music Publishing House, referred to by its short name, Muzgiz, then, in 1964, referred to as Muzika (or Muzyka or Музыка, in Russian).

Dissolution of the Soviet Union

Following the dissolution of the Soviet Union (1990 to 1991), state-owned enterprises, including Muzyka, suffered from newly imposed austere budgets.  Muzyka lost its actual monopoly and its leading positions in several areas.  As of 2006, Muzyka was owned by the Russian Federation, but the government was planning to privatize it that year.  The strategic plan to resuscitate Muzyka was to focus on educational literature.

The new P. Jurgenson music publishing house

In 2004, Muzyka's acting director, Dr. Mark A. Zilberquit (with the support of the publisher's great-grandson and President of the P. Jurgenson Charitable Fund, Boris Jurgenson), led an effort to register a newly formed P. Jurgenson music publishing company as a Russian company.  The new P. Jurgenson company does not possess Muzyka's assets that were once held by the original P. Jurgenson.

References

External links 
 IMSLP / Petrucci Music Library site
 P. Jurgenson website
 Muzyka website 

Jurgenson
Publishing companies established in 1861
Jurgenson
1861 establishments in the Russian Empire
Music organizations based in Russia